The U.S. state of Louisiana has a total of nine metropolitan statistical areas (MSAs); 30 of Louisiana's sixty-four (64) parishes are classified as metropolitan. According to the 2010 United States census, these parishes had a combined population of 3,340,667 (74.8% of the state's population). Based on a July 1, 2009, population estimate, that figure had increased to 3,356,913 (74.7% of the state's population).

The following table lists Louisiana's metropolitan areas, ranked by population as of the 2020 American Community Survey's census estimates program.

See also 

 Louisiana statistical areas

References

 
 
Metropolitan areas